Larceny is a comedy film starring Andy Dick, Joshua Leonard, and Tyra Banks.

References

External links
 
 

2004 films
American independent films
2000s English-language films
2000s American films